The 2022–23 season is the 125th season in the existence of SK Rapid Wien and the club's 74rd consecutive season in the top flight of Austrian football. In addition to the domestic league, Rapid Wien will participate in this season's edition of the Austrian Cup and enters international football in the second qualifying round to the UEFA Europa Conference League having won the previous Bundesliga seasons ECL play-offs.

Squad

Squad statistics

Goal scorers

Disciplinary record

Transfers

In

Out

Pre-season and friendlies

Competitions

Overall record

Austrian Football Bundesliga

Results summary

Results by round

Regular season

Table

Matches

Austrian Cup

UEFA Europa Conference League

Second qualifying round

Third qualifying round

Play-off round

References

SK Rapid Wien seasons
Rapid Wien